There are 16 supermarket chains currently operating in the United Kingdom. The food retail market has traditionally been dominanted by the 'big four' supermarkets -Tesco, Sainsbury's, Asda and Morrisons - who made up over three quarters of sector market share in 2010. Tesco is the largest retailer in Great Britain, with a market share of 27.5% at the end of 2022.

However, discounters Lidl and Aldi have grown rapidly. A number of sources reported that in September 2022, Aldi overtook Morrisons to become Great Britain's fourth largest grocery retailer. At the end of 2022, Morrisons and Aldi both remained at 9.1%. Collectively, the big four accounted for two thirds and the big four and discounters combined for four fifths of the grocery market share at the end of 2022.

Northern Ireland has similar major chains. In 2022, Tesco was the largest retailer in NI, followed by Sainsbury's, Asda and Lidl. However, the market is different because some chains are not shared between the different parts of the UK. For example, Aldi and Morrisons do not operate there.

List of current UK supermarket chains

List of defunct UK supermarket chains 
These supermarkets are either no longer trading, have been renamed, or have been taken over and rebranded.

Waitrose effect
Proximity to a supermarket has been widely reported to be an amenity that can have a significant effect on residential property prices in Britain. Beginning under Andy Hulme and continuing under Mike Songer, the home mortgage unit of Lloyds Bank has published pricing research that examines the premiums commanded by homes in a given neighbourhood against comparables in the same post-code and correlates the difference in price with convenience of access to the various supermarkets. The following table averages information from neighbourhoods across England and Wales, compiled by Lloyds Bank for their 2016 report using supermarket location information from CACI Datalab and house price information from the UK Land Registry.

See also
List of supermarkets, for supermarkets worldwide
Kantar Worldpanel – UK grocery market share figures
List of convenience shops in the United Kingdom
List of discount shops in the United Kingdom
List of clothing and footwear shops in the United Kingdom

Notes

References

 
United Kingdom
Supermarkets
Defunct supermarkets of the United Kingdom